The Naiad 18 is a Canadian trailerable sailboat, that was designed by Mark Ellis, first built from 1984 to 1986, and named for the mythological water sprites.

Production
The boat was built by Luna Yachts in Oakville, Ontario, Canada, between 1984 and 1986, but it is now out of production. It is believed that 20 were completed. Although one was destroyed, by 2013, 19 remained in service.

Design

The Naiad 18 is a small, open, recreational keelboat, built predominantly of fiberglass, with wood trim. It has a cat rig, a plumb stem, a vertical transom, a transom-hung rudder, a wishbone boom and a  centerboard that folds up into a trunk. It displaces  and carries  of ballast.

The boat can be optionally fitted with a small outboard motor for docking and maneuvering.

See also
List of sailing boat types

Related development
Nonsuch (sailboat) - a line of larger catboats also designed by Mark Ellis

Similar sailboats
Buccaneer 200
Catalina 18
Com-Pac Sunday Cat
Drascombe Lugger
Drascombe Scaffie
Houdini (sailboat)
Hunter 18.5
Hunter 19-1
Hunter 19 (Europa)
Hunter 146
Mercury 18
Sandpiper 565
Sanibel 17
Siren 17
Typhoon 18

References

External links

Keelboats
1980s sailboat type designs
Sailing yachts
Trailer sailers
Sailboat type designs by Mark Ellis
Sailboat types built by Luna Yachts